Nashville Blues is an album of American guitarist Norman Blake, released in 1984.

Track listing 
 "Columbus Stockade Blues" (trad)
 "My Name Is Morgan ( But It Ain't J.P.)" (trad)
 "The Streamlined Cannonball" (Roy Acuff)
 "Pretty Bird" (Norman Blake)
 "In the Spring of the Year" (Norman Blake)
 "We're Living in the Future" (Norman Blake)
 "Nobody's Business" (trad)
 "Sally Ann" (trad)
 "I Was Born 4000 Years Ago" (trad)
 "Nashville Blues" (Alton Delmore)
 "The Banks Of Good Hope/The Green Fields of America" trad)

Personnel 
 Norman Blake – Guitar, Mandocello, Vocals
 Nancy Blake  - Cello
 Charlie Collins  - Guitar, Fiddle
 Peter Ostroushko - Mandolin, Fiddle
 Eugene O'Donnel - Fiddle
 Mick Moloney - Tenor Banjo

References 

1984 albums
Norman Blake (American musician) albums